Northern Counties may refer to:

Northern Counties Committee (1903-1949), a railway company of Northeast Ireland 
Northern Counties East Football League, an English association football league
Northern Counties Motor & Engineering Company, a former English bus-manufacturer

See also
 County